Mashi (Kamaxi), or Kwandu, is a Bantu language of Zambia and Angola. It was assigned by Guthrie to Bantu group K.30, which Pfouts (2003) established as part of the Kavango–Southwest branch of Bantu. Though not specifically addressed, Mashi may be in that family as well.

References 

Kavango languages